All Saints is a civil parish in East Devon, Devon, England.  It has a population of 498 according to the 2001 census.  The parish includes the hamlets of All Saints, Smallridge, Churchill, Alston and Waggs Plot. This area also has one cricket pitch, a primary school, pre-school and a church.

References

External links

Villages in Devon